Rangachari Madhavan (born 29 October 1960) is an Indian former first-class cricketer who represented Tamil Nadu.

Life and career
Born in Chennai, Madhavan played as an all-rounder who batted left-handed and bowled slow left-arm orthodox. He appeared in 39 first-class and 5 List A matches, before which he represented India Under-19s in Youth Tests. He also played for India Under-25s and South Zone during his career. He played his last first-class match in the 1989/90 season, aged 29.

Madhavan was a chartered accountant by profession. He lived in the Middle East for ten years and returned to Chennai in the mid-2000s. He was appointed member of the Under-19 selection committee of Tamil Nadu. He then became a member of the senior team selection committee, after which he became its Chairman.

References

External links 
 
 

1960 births
Living people
Indian cricketers
Tamil Nadu cricketers
South Zone cricketers